Dr John Law Farrands   (11 March 1921 – 14 July 1996) was a scientist and senior Australian Public Servant.

Life and career
John Farrands was born on 11 March 1921 in Melbourne. He studied part-time at University of Melbourne for his Bachelor of Science, majoring in physics and mathematics.

Farrands was the Chief Defence Scientist and he was Secretary of the Australian Government science department between 1977 and 1981.

Farrands retired from the Australian Public Service on Christmas Eve 1981.

Farrands died in Melbourne on 14 July 1996.

Awards
Farrands was made a Companion of the Order of the Bath in December 1981 when he was Secretary of the Department of Science.
In June 1990 Farrands was made an Officer of the Order of Australia in recognition of service to science and technology.

References

1921 births
1996 deaths
Australian Companions of the Order of the Bath
Australian public servants
Officers of the Order of Australia
University of Melbourne alumni
Chief Defence Scientists
20th-century Australian public servants